The 1942 Baylor Bears football team represented Baylor University in the Southwest Conference (SWC) during the 1942 college football season. In their second season under head coach Frank Kimbrough, the Bears compiled a 6–4–1 record (3–2–1 against conference opponents), finished in fourth place in the conference, and outscored opponents by a combined total of 148 to 116. They played their home games at Municipal Stadium in Waco, Texas.  Milton Crain and Bill Coleman were the team captains.

Schedule

References

Baylor
Baylor Bears football seasons
Baylor Bears football